The William Whitehead House, also known as Hillview Ranch, in Boise, Idaho, is a -story Bungalow designed by Tourtellotte & Hummel and constructed in 1910. The house includes a cross gable, overhanging roof supported by decorative knee braces. Rafter tails are exposed under the eaves, and verge boards are decorated with half-moon cutouts. The house was added to the National Register of Historic Places (NRHP) in 2016.

Pharmacist William S. Whitehead arrived in Boise in 1889, and the Whitehead & Boomer Pharmacy was located in that year in a building owned by John Lemp. Whitehead purchased a 40-acre parcel and operated a fruit orchard on the Hillview Ranch property, although the current site is 1.5 acres.

References

External links
 
 Hawley, Donald S. Whitehead in History of Idaho: The Gem of the Mountains (S.J. Clarke & Co., 1920), pp 683

		
National Register of Historic Places in Boise, Idaho
Houses in Boise, Idaho
Houses completed in 1910
Bungalow architecture in Idaho
Tourtellotte & Hummel buildings